Mordellistena dives is a species of beetle in the family Mordellidae which is in the genus Mordellistena. It was described in 1876 by Emery. and can be found in Hungary and southern part of Russia.

References

dives
Beetles described in 1876
Beetles of Europe